Iola is a city in Grimes County, Texas, United States, on Farm Road 39 and the Burlington-Rock Island Railway, at the headwaters of Ragan Creek in northwest Grimes County. As of the 2010 census the population was 401.

History
On November 6, 2007, it became the fifth incorporated city in Grimes County after a residential vote.

Iola is believed to have been named for Edward Ariola, one of Stephen F. Austin's colonists who settled in the vicinity in 1836. In 1852 the community's first church, Zion Methodist, was constructed; the building also served as a schoolhouse. The settlement's first gristmill, Monroe's Gin, began operating during the 1860s. The post office opened in 1871 and, though discontinued the next year, was permanently reestablished in 1877. A Masonic Lodge was formed in 1876. By the 1880s the town had several churches, cotton gins, and gristmills. The population stood at 109 by 1890.

Between 1906 and 1907 both the Trinity and Brazos Valley Railway and the Houston and Texas Central Railway extended lines through Iola, and a new townsite was laid out along the tracks near the T&BV depot. A tap line of the Texas and New Orleans Railroad connected Iola with Navasota. The coming of the railroad invigorated the community. A print shop was established, and a newspaper appeared, the Iola Enterprise, edited and published by Rev. A. J. Frick, pastor of Zion Methodist Church. In 1909 the Iola State Bank was organized. The population reached 300 in 1910, and by 1936 the town had an estimated 500 people and twelve businesses.

After World War II the population declined somewhat to an estimated 300 in 1950. Since then it has remained virtually level. During the 1970s and 1980s several nearby oilfields opened. In 1990 Iola had a population estimated at 331 and twelve businesses. In 2000 the population remained the same, but there were 39 businesses.

Geography
Iola is located in northwestern Grimes County between Bryan,  to the southwest, and Huntsville,  to the east.

Demographics

Education

The Iola Independent School District has two campuses – Iola High School (Grades 7–12) and Iola Elementary School (Grades PK–6).

Notable people

Chris Andersen, professional basketball player

References

External links

Iola, TX – Texas Handbook Online.

Cities in Texas
Cities in Grimes County, Texas